Charles Upton may refer to:

 Charles W. Upton (born c. 1943), American economist
 Charles H. Upton (1812–1877), politician and statesman from Massachusetts and Virginia
 Charles Upton (poet) (born 1948), American poet, Sufi and metaphysician
 Charles L. Upton (1870–1936), American physician and college football coach
 Charles Upton Lowe (1921-2012), for whom Oculocerebrorenal syndrome or Lowe syndrome was named
 Charles Upton, High Sheriff of Derbyshire in 1809